Kim Bong-nae (born 15 July 1942) is a South Korean long-distance runner. He competed in the marathon at the 1968 Summer Olympics.

References

1942 births
Living people
Athletes (track and field) at the 1968 Summer Olympics
South Korean male long-distance runners
South Korean male marathon runners
Olympic athletes of South Korea
20th-century South Korean people